Coldenham is a hamlet in Orange County, in the U.S. state of New York.

History
A post office called Coldenham was established in 1820, and remained in operation until 1905. The hamlet was named after Cadwallader Colden, an early settler.

References

Hamlets in Orange County, New York